Tunturu is a major Kannada bi-monthly children's magazine, published in Karnataka, India, which has its headquarters in Manipal, Karnataka.

From past few years, Sandhya Pai has been the Managing editor, of the magazine.

History
The magazine was launched in January 2000, by Manipal Media Network Ltd. (MMNL).

Sister publications
 Roopatara, a Kannada monthly film magazine
 Taranga, a Kannada weekly family interest magazine
 Tushara, a Kannada monthly literary magazine
 Udayavani, a Kannada daily newspaper

See also

 Balamangala, a defunct Kannada fortnightly children magazine
 Chutuka, Kannada monthly children magazine
 List of Kannada-language magazines
 Media in Karnataka
 Media in India

References

Biweekly magazines published in India
Children's magazines published in India
Kannada-language magazines
Magazines about comics
Magazines established in 2000
Mass media in Karnataka